4348 Poulydamas  is a large Jupiter Trojan from the Trojan camp, approximately  in diameter. It was discovered on 11 September 1988, by American astronomer Carolyn Shoemaker at the Palomar Observatory in California. The assumed C-type asteroid belongs to the 40 largest Jupiter trojans and has a rotation period of 9.9 hours. It was named after Poulydamas from Greek mythology.

Orbit and classification 

Poulydamas is a dark Jovian asteroid orbiting in the trailering Trojan camp at Jupiter's  Lagrangian point, 60° behind its orbit in a 1:1 resonance (see Trojans in astronomy). It is also a non-family asteroid of the Jovian background population.

It orbits the Sun at a distance of 4.7–5.7 AU once every 12 years (4,383 days; semi-major axis of 5.24 AU). Its orbit has an eccentricity of 0.10 and an inclination of 8° with respect to the ecliptic. The body's observation arc begins with a precovery taken at Palomar in October 1953, nearly 35 years prior to its official discovery observation.

Physical characteristics 

Poulydamas is an assumed, carbonaceous C-type asteroid.

Rotation period 

In December 1990, a first rotational lightcurve of Poulydamas was obtained by Stefano Mottola and Mario Di Martino using the 1.52-meter Loiano Telescope at the Bologna Observatory in Italy. Lightcurve analysis gave a well-defined rotation period of  hours with an amplitude of  magnitude.

In October 2013, astronomers at the Palomar Transient Factory measured a period of 9.9214 hours and a brightness variation of 0.23 magnitude in the R-band.

Between 2015 and 2018, photometric observations by Robert Stephens at the Center for Solar System Studies, California, rendered four similar, rotational periods of 9.88, 9.922, 9.937 and 9.941 hours with four corresponding amplitudes of 0.19, 0.34, 0.27 and 0.29 magnitude

Diameter and albedo 

According to the surveys carried out by the Japanese Akari satellite and the NEOWISE mission of NASA's Wide-field Infrared Survey Explorer, Poulydamas measures 82.03 and 87.51 kilometers in diameter and its surface has an albedo of 0.033 and 0.048, respectively. The Collaborative Asteroid Lightcurve Link assumes a standard albedo for a carbonaceous asteroid of 0.057, and calculates a diameter of 70.08 kilometers based on an absolute magnitude of 9.5.

Naming 

This minor planet was named by the discoverer from Greek mythology after Poulydamas, the closest counselor and strategist of the Trojan prince Hector, after whom the minor planet 624 Hektor is named. Hector and Poulydamas were born on the same night. While the gods gave Hector the ability to perfectly master his arms, Poulydamas was given the present of better judgment. It was Poulydamas who urged to lock the gates of Troy against Achilles , but Hector left the city and confronted him nonetheless, which led to his doom and to the city's eventual downfall during the Trojan War. The official naming citation was published on 28 April 1991.

Notes

References

External links 
 Asteroid Lightcurve Database (LCDB), query form (info )
 Dictionary of Minor Planet Names, Google books
 Discovery Circumstances: Numbered Minor Planets (1)-(5000) – Minor Planet Center
 
 

004348
Discoveries by Carolyn S. Shoemaker
Named minor planets
19880911